Zu Cui (born 20 June 1990) is a Chinese team handball player. She plays for the club Anhui HC, and on the Chinese national team. She represented China at the 2013 World Women's Handball Championship in Serbia, where the Chinese team placed 18th.

References

Chinese female handball players
1990 births
Living people